The Dr. J.W. Ellis House is a historic house at 62 State Street in Augusta, Maine.
 Built in 1855 for a prominent local doctor, it is a fine example of late Greek Revival architecture. It was listed on the National Register of Historic Places in 1979.

Description and history
The Ellis House stands west of Augusta's Water Street downtown, on the west side of State Street (Maine State Route 27), opposite its junction with Church Street. State Street is a major north–south route through the city. The house is a -story wood-frame structure, with a gabled roof, clapboard siding, and granite foundation. The main (east-facing) facade is three bays wide, with fluted pilasters at the corners rising to a broad entablature. Windows are sash, topped by narrow corniced entablatures. The main entrance is recessed, with sidelights on either side; the opening around the recess is framed by pilasters and an entablature with a carved floral panel on top.  The interior follows a typical center hall plan, with a graceful curving staircase, and original woodwork in many of the rooms.

The house was built about 1855 for Dr. Joseph Willard Ellis, and is a fine example of late Greek Revival design; its designer is not known. Dr. Ellis served for many years as Augusta's city physician and in private practice. The house was a private residence until 1970, when it was purchased by the Maine Democratic Party for use as its headquarters.

See also
National Register of Historic Places listings in Kennebec County, Maine

References

Houses on the National Register of Historic Places in Maine
National Register of Historic Places in Augusta, Maine
Houses completed in 1855
Houses in Augusta, Maine
Greek Revival houses in Maine